Richard G. Baldwin (January 9, 1911 – October 28, 1996) was an American film actor. He was married to the actress Cecilia Parker.

Filmography

References

Bibliography
 Philippa Gates. Detecting Men: Masculinity and the Hollywood Detective Film. SUNY Press, 2012.

External links

1911 births
1996 deaths
American male film actors
Male actors from Oregon
People from Linn County, Oregon
20th-century American male actors